Richard Shepherd Software was a British software house active between 1982 and 1985. The company was mainly known for releasing text adventure games. These were programmed by Richard Shepherd himself and Pete Cooke.

History 

Richard Shepherd had worked as an accountant and taught himself programming on a ZX81 in his spare time. During this time his wife Elaine took an interest in text adventure games. Upon her disappointment about a purchased game Richard suggested writing their own. Their company started out in February 1982 from the Shepherd's dining room in their house in Maidenhead. Its first product was Bargain Bytes, a collection of games and utilities for the ZX81. Due to the release of the ZX81's successor ZX Spectrum in April 1982 the company had to switch to the new machine. A major step for the company was when retailer WHSmith ordered the adventure Transylvanian Tower for its stores in February 1983. At this point Richard Shepherd quit his daytime job and focused on the software company. The company moved into an office in Slough and hired the first employees.

Richard Shepherd's finance utility, Cash Controller, was the first Spectrum program to be designed to work with the ZX Microdrive. 

In 1991 an issue of Amstrad Action (May, No. 68 p. 70) published an artillery game type-in program called Warzone. Consisting of 144 lines of code, the author was noted down as one "Richard Shephard down Bristol way".

List of publications
Cash Controller (1983)
Devils of the Deep (1983)
Everest Ascent (1983)
The Inferno (1984)
Invincible Island (1983)
Jackpot Fruit Machine (1982)
Monster Mine (1982)
Shaken but not Stirred (1982)
Ship of the Line (1982)
Ski Star 2000 (1985)
Submarine Attack (1982)
Super Space Mission (1982)
Super Spy (1982)
Transylvanian Tower (1982)
Upper Gumtree (1984)
Urban Upstart (1983)

References

External links
 Richard Shepherd Software at World of Spectrum
 

1982 establishments in England
1985 disestablishments in England
British companies disestablished in 1985
British companies established in 1982
Defunct video game companies of the United Kingdom
Software companies disestablished in 1985
Software companies established in 1982